Noor Ul Hassan (in Punjabi and ; born 25 February 1971) is a Pakistani actor, television presenter, television host and compere. He hosted the Ramadan transmission in 2011 and in 2014 for PTV Home. He appeared in acclaimed television serials such as Ishq Jalebi, Dar Si Jaati Hai Sila, Aangan, Ranjha Ranjha Kardi  and Cheekh.

Early life 
Noor Ul Hassan was born on 25 February 1971 in Lahore, Pakistan. He studied from National College of Arts in Lahore.

Career 
He made his acting debut in early in 1990s from PTV Network. At that time, he appeared in television serials such as Kollege Jeans and Wrong Numbers. In 2012, he acted in Ab Ke Sawan Barsay.

Breakthrough 
In 2017, Noor ul Hassan was cast in the HUM TV award-winning television Islamic series Alif Allah Aur Insaan. In the same year, Hassan then acted in another award-winning drama Dar Si Jaati Hai Sila on HUM TV. Noor ul Hassan was also a part of ARY Digital's award-winning series Aangan in the same year. In 2019, Noor was cast in Cheekh which was acclaimed by critics and viewer as one of the most successful show of ARY Digital at that time. In the same year, he acted in Geo's super hit drama Deewangi. In 2020, Noor was cast in yet another famous Geo Entertainment drama Bandhay Aik Dor Say. In 2020, Noor acted in season 3 of Khuda Aur Mohabbat which released in 2021. In 2021, Noor acted in Geo's Ramazan special ':Ishq Jalebi'' where performed role of Ashiq Hussain. The show received a lot of positive reception.

Filmography

Television

Film

References 

Living people
Pakistani male television actors
Pakistani television hosts
Male actors from Lahore
1971 births